This article provides a list of general officers and marshals of the Romanian Armed Forces, along with an overview of their service, major battles and awards, and other select biographical details. A general officer, or general, is an officer of high rank in an army. The Romanian Armed Forces have four ranks of general officer, in ascending order of rank: Brigadier General, Major General, Lieutenant General, General.

In cases of exceptional military service, the President of Romania may award a general the rank of Mareșal, or Marshal of Romania, the highest military rank in the Romanian Armed Forces.

Marshals of Romania

Generals

References

Romanian generals
Lists of Romanian military personnel
Romanian Armed Forces